María del Carmen Barea Cobos (born 5 October 1966 in Málaga) is a former field hockey defender from Spain, who was a member of the Women's National Team that surprisingly won the gold medal at the 1992 Summer Olympics on home soil (Barcelona).

She also represented her native country at the 1996 Summer Olympics (Atlanta, Georgia) and at the 2000 Summer Olympics (Sydney). Carmen Barea played club hockey for Universidad de Sevilla.

External links
 
 
 

1966 births
Living people
Spanish female field hockey players
Olympic field hockey players of Spain
Field hockey players at the 1992 Summer Olympics
Field hockey players at the 1996 Summer Olympics
Field hockey players at the 2000 Summer Olympics
Olympic gold medalists for Spain
Olympic medalists in field hockey
Medalists at the 1992 Summer Olympics
20th-century Spanish women